Matej Kök (born 11 December 1996) is a Slovenian male volleyball player. He is part of the Slovenia men's national volleyball team and plays the position of Wing Spiker. At club level he plays for ACH Volley Ljubljana.

See also 
 Slovenia men's national volleyball team

References

External links 
 FIVB 2016 Stats
 FIVB 2015 Stats
 Giani gathers Slovenian Volleyball heroes ahead of World League debut
 Slovenia Men's Team Start Preparations for World League
 WorldOfVolley
 NCSA Sports

1996 births
Living people
Slovenian men's volleyball players